Teenage USA Recordings is a Canadian independent record label, founded by Phil Klygo and Mark DiPietro in the fall of 1997 on the back of Klygo's Skull Geek record label and fanzine.

The label, based in Toronto, has released records by artists such as Elevator, Eric's Trip, The Weekend, Pecola, Gaffer, Smallmouth, Peaches, Stink Mitt, Dan Bryk, Kid Lunch,  Thanatopop, Cecil Seaskull, Two-Minute Miracles, Lonnie James, Blood Meridian, Solar Baby, Robin Black, The Zoobombs, The Exploders, 122 Greige,
The Killer Elite, Neck, and Mean Red Spiders.

Song Corporation bought into the label in 2000 and named Klygo and DiPietro as Song's Directors of Artistic Development. Following Song's bankruptcy a year later, the pair regained ownership of their label and signed a distribution deal with Outside Music. Shortly thereafter, DiPietro took a job at Outside, running their in-house label in addition to teenage USA. Klygo took over as Festival Director at Canadian Music Week, as well as starting a new experimental gallery-salon space with artist Germaine Koh called (weewerk) that eventually became a record label.

Teenage USA Recordings discography

(teen037)THE WEEKEND - Beatbox My Heartbeat

(teen036)STINK MITT - Biker Shorts Remix 12" w/ Jabba the Slut

(teen035)BLOOD MERIDIAN - We Almost Made it Home

(teen034)THE WEEKEND - Teaser + Bonus Level

(teen033)GREAT LAKE SWIMMERS - GREAT LAKE SWIMMERS

(teen032)TWO-MINUTE MIRACLES - Volume III "The Silence Of Animals"

(teen031)STINK MITT - Scratch 'n' Sniff

(teen030)MEAN RED SPIDERS - Still Life Fast Moving

(teen029)THE WEEKEND - Teaser EP

(teen028)THE ZOOBOMBS - Bomb You Live

(teen027)THE EXPLODERS - New Variations

(teen026)The Killer Elite - End Of A Whip / Talk About The City 7"

(teen025)ERIC'S TRIP - The Eric's Trip Show

(teen024)GORD DISLEY - Shots Fired / Comedy Record

(teen023)ELEVATOR - Taste of Complete Perspective CD/LP

(teen022)TWO-MINUTE MIRACLES - Volume II

(teen021)DAN BRYK - Lovers Leap

(teen020)THE EXPLODERS - Who's Who & What's What 7"

(teen019)MEAN RED SPIDERS - Starsandsons

(teen018)ROBIN BLACK & THE IRS - Star Shaped Single EP

(teen017)PEACHES - PEACHES EP

(teen016)THE WEEKEND - THE WEEKEND

(teen015)THANATOPOP - Four Track Mind

(teen014)LONNIE JAMES - Dee-O

(teen012)TWO-MINUTE MIRACLES - Volume I

(teen011)KID LUNCH - KID LUNCH

(teen010)122 GREIGE - Moving Away from the Sun

(teen009)NECK - Uncrated Distant Star EP

(teen008)CECIL SEASKULL - Whoever

(teen007)SOLARBABY - The Power of Negative Prayer

(teen006)MEAN RED SPIDERS - Places You Call Home

(teen005)GAFFER - Snow Falls Like Stars

(teen004)LONNIE JAMES - This Land is Your Land

(teen003)PECOLA/SMALLMOUTH - Split 7"

(teen002)PECOLA - Dat Hoang EP

(teen001)SMALLMOUTH - All Ports in Frequent Seas

See also 
 List of record labels

References

External links
 Teenage USA website
 (weewerk) website

Canadian independent record labels
Indie rock record labels
Record labels established in 1997
Companies based in Toronto